Manfred Kaltz (born 6 January 1953) is a German former football player and manager, who played as a right-back.

Kaltz played in the Bundesliga for Hamburger SV and 13 times (one goal) for FC Mulhouse in Ligue 1 after initially joining Mulhouse league rivals Girondins de Bordeaux 1989. He returned to Hamburg the season after, the consequence of the relegation of FC Mulhouse from Ligue 1 at the end of 1989–90. Previously, Kaltz was forced to leave Hamburg, the club for which he had been a professional since the 1971–72 season, after the authorities (e.g. Erich Ribbeck) had decided not to go on with the contract of the long-serving full-back. Their successors lured him back from France in September 1990 to give him the chance to serve his final year as a player at his old club.

In total he played in 581 Bundesliga games for Hamburger SV (HSV), to this day remaining the second greatest total of an individual in Bundesliga history. An expert in penalties, the Hamburg fan-favourite scored 53 of his 76 goals from the spot, a record in the Bundesliga. Internationally he was part of the squad that won the 1980 UEFA European title.

Kaltz was famous for his right-footed crosses, which he hit with so much spin that they curved like a banana. They were affectionately called "Bananenflanken" ("banana crosses"). He often used this technique to set up hulking striker Horst Hrubesch, whose 96 goals with HSV included many from Kaltz crosses that Hrubesch headed into the opposing goal. Hrubesch once described their partnership when he explained one of his goals with the often quoted words "Manni banana, I head, goal".

Honours
Hamburger SV
 Bundesliga: 1978–79, 1981–82, 1982–83
 DFB-Pokal: 1975–76, 1986–87
 DFB-Ligapokal: 1972–73
 European Cup: 1982–83
 UEFA Cup Winners' Cup: 1976–77

West Germany
 UEFA European Championship: 1980
 UEFA European Championship runner-up: 1976
 FIFA World Cup runner-up: 1982

Individual
 kicker Bundesliga Team of the Season: 1976–77, 1978–79, 1979–80, 1980–81, 1981–82, 1985–86

References

1953 births
Living people
West German expatriate footballers
German footballers
Germany international footballers
Germany B international footballers
Germany under-21 international footballers
Hamburger SV players
FC Girondins de Bordeaux players
Expatriate footballers in France
FC Mulhouse players
German football managers
UEFA Euro 1976 players
UEFA Euro 1980 players
UEFA European Championship-winning players
1978 FIFA World Cup players
1982 FIFA World Cup players
Bundesliga players
Ligue 1 players
Sportspeople from Ludwigshafen
Association football fullbacks
Footballers from Rhineland-Palatinate
West German footballers
West German expatriate sportspeople in France